Shooting in the 2004 Summer Paralympics consisted of twelve events spread over two main classes:
 Class SH 1 - Pistol and rifle competitors who don't require a shooting stand
 Class SH 2 - Rifle competitors who require a shooting stand due to disability in the upper limbs
The contests were held at the Markopoulo Olympic Shooting Centre.

Participating countries

Medal table

Medal summary

See also
Shooting at the 2004 Summer Olympics

References

 
2004 Summer Paralympics events
2004
Paralympics
Shooting competitions in Greece